Pain Mahalleh-ye Gildeh (also Romanized as Pā’īn Maḩalleh-ye Gīldeh; also known as Gīldeh-e Pā’īn and Pā’īn Maḩalleh-ye Geldeh) is a village in Dehgah Rural District, Kiashahr District, Astaneh-ye Ashrafiyeh County, Gilan Province, Iran. At the 2006 census, its population was 473, in 144 families.

References 

Populated places in Astaneh-ye Ashrafiyeh County